K-1 World Grand Prix 2007 Final was a martial arts event held by the K-1 on Saturday December 8, 2007 at the Yokohama Arena in Yokohama, Japan. It was the 15th K-1 World GP Final, the culmination of a year full of regional elimination tournaments. All fights followed K-1's classic tournament format and were conducted under K-1 Rules, three rounds of three minutes each, with a possible tiebreaker.

The qualification for top eight fighters, K-1 World GP 2007 in Seoul Final 16 was held on October 28, 2007 in Seoul, Korea.

The event drew a sellout crowd of 17,667 to the Yokohama Arena. It was broadcast live in Japan on the Fuji TV network; in South Korea on XTM; in Hong Kong on PCCW; in Australia on Main Event; in Brazil on Globosat; in Canada on The Fight Network; in Romania on ProTV; in Hungary on RTL Klub and across Scandinavia on Viasat. With all the delayed broadcasts bringing it to a total of 135 countries. The English language commentary team was headed by an Australian Michael Schiavello, with four time K-1 World Champion Ernesto Hoost, Ray Sefo and Akebono. The event ring announcer was Jimmy Lennon Jr.

K-1 World Grand Prix 2007 Final Tournament

Results

Opening Fights: K-1 Rules / 3Min. 3R
Mitsugu Noda  def. Noel Cadet 
Noda defeated Cadet by TKO at 1:13 of the 2nd Round.

Jan Nortje  def. Dong-wook Kim 
Nortje defeated Kim by TKO (Punch) at 0:11 of the 2nd Round.

Takashi Tashikawa  def. Ki-min Kim 
Tashikawa defeated Kim by KO at 1:21 of the 1st Round.

Reserve Fight: K-1 Rules / 3Min. 3R Ext.1R
Paul Slowinski  def. Mighty Mo 
Slowinski defeated Mo by TKO (Low Kicks) at 0:50 of the 2nd Round.
                              
Quarter Finals: K-1 Rules / 3Min. 3R Ext.1R
Jérôme Le Banner  def. Choi Hong-man 
Le Banner defeated Choi by 3rd Round Unanimous Decision 3-0 (30-29, 30-28, 30-29).

Semmy Schilt  def. Glaube Feitosa 
Schilt defeated Feitosa by 3rd Round Unanimous Decision 3-0 (30-27, 30-28, 30-27).
                         
Remy Bonjasky   def. Badr Hari 
Bonjasky defeated Hari by 3rd Round Majority Decision 2-0 (30-29, 29-29, 30-29).
                      
Peter Aerts  def. Junichi Sawayashiki 
Aerts defeated Sawayashiki by KO (Straight Right Punch) at 1:29 of the 1st Round.

Semi Finals: K-1 Rules / 3Min. 3R Ext.1R
Semmy Schilt  def. Jérôme Le Banner 
Schilt defeated Le Banner by TKO (Corner Stoppage) at 1:02 of the 2nd Round.

Peter Aerts  def. Remy Bonjasky 
Aerts defeated Bonjasky by 3rd Round Unanimous Decision 3-0 (30-29, 30-27, 30-28).
                            
Super Fight: K-1 Rules / 3Min. 3R Ext.2R
Musashi  def. David Dancrade 
Musashi defeated Dancrade by KO (Left Mid Kick) at 2:59 of the 1st Round.

Final: K-1 Rules / 3Min. 3R Ext.2R
Semmy Schilt  def. Peter Aerts 
Schilt defeated Aerts by TKO (Knee Injury) at 1:49 of the 1st Round.

The tournament winner Semmy Schilt of Netherlands became the first fighter ever in K-1 history to win the Championship three years in a row and picked up a winner's purse of US$400,000.

For the last six years, the K-1 World GP Champion has been a Dutchman and in K-1's 15-year history, a Dutch fighter has won the World GP a total of 12 times.
                      
Line-up changes before the event:
 Paul Slowinski replaces announced fighter  Chalid Arrab due to an Appendicitis.

 David Dancrade replaces announced fighter  Souleimane Konate due to an injury.

 Ray Sefo is not cleared to fight by the doctor due to an eye injury sustained during training. The Reserve Fight #2 is dropped from the card and his opponent Paul Slowinski is moved up to Reserve Fight #1.

See also
List of K-1 events
K-1 World Grand Prix
List of male kickboxers

References

External links
K-1 WGP 2007 Official Website
Official photos
K-1sport.de - Your Source for Everything K-1

K-1 events
2007 in kickboxing
Kickboxing in Japan
Sport in Yokohama